Estelle Baskerville (born November 15, 1946) is an American athlete. She competed in the women's high jump at the 1964 Summer Olympics and the 1968 Summer Olympics.

References

1946 births
Living people
Athletes (track and field) at the 1964 Summer Olympics
Athletes (track and field) at the 1968 Summer Olympics
American female high jumpers
Olympic track and field athletes of the United States
Athletes (track and field) at the 1963 Pan American Games
Pan American Games track and field athletes for the United States
Tennessee State Lady Tigers track and field athletes
Track and field athletes from Ohio
Sportspeople from Columbus, Ohio
20th-century American women